Mohamed Camara (born 9 July 1999) is a Guinean footballer who currently plays as a defender for Ashanti GB.

Career statistics

International

References

1999 births
Living people
Guinean footballers
Guinea international footballers
Association football defenders
Wakriya AC players
AS Ashanti Golden Boys players
Guinea A' international footballers
2020 African Nations Championship players